The Stars at the Sun game was played on July 10, 2010 at Mohegan Sun Arena in Uncasville, Connecticut, home of the Connecticut Sun. This game, unlike previous non-Olympic year games, was a contest between the USA women's national team and a team of WNBA All-Stars. This game is not considered a WNBA All-Star Game. This was the third time Connecticut has hosted the mid-season basketball showcase, after previously hosting the 2005 and 2009 All-Star games.

The Game

Rosters

1 Injured
2 Injury replacement
3 Starting in place of injured player

Coaches
The coach for Team USA is Connecticut Huskies women's basketball coach Geno Auriemma. The coach for the WNBA Team is Seattle Storm coach Brian Agler.

Other events

Three-Point Shootout

Skills Challenge

References

Wnba All-star Game, 2010
Women's National Basketball Association All-Star Game